8th Congress may refer to:

8th Congress of the Philippines (1987–1992)
8th Congress of the Russian Communist Party (Bolsheviks) (1919)
8th National Congress of the Chinese Communist Party (1956)
8th National Congress of the Kuomintang (1957)
8th National Congress of the Lao People's Revolutionary Party (2006)
8th National People's Congress (1993–1998)
8th United States Congress (1803–1805)